Fredericktown High School is a public high school in Fredericktown, Ohio.  It is the only high school in the Fredericktown Local School District.  Their athletic teams are known as the Freddies with school colors of red and gray.

Notable alumni
Dwight Agnew, U.S. Navy officer
Luke Perry, actor, best known for his roles on Beverly Hills, 90210 and Riverdale
Ollie Cline, professional football player in the National Football League (NFL)
Thomas Caputo, 2020 OHSAA state cross country champion in the Division III boys race.

External links

Notes and references

High schools in Knox County, Ohio
Public high schools in Ohio